Fighting Trooper is a 1934 American Western film directed by Ray Taylor.

The film is also known as The Trooper in the United Kingdom.

Cast
Kermit Maynard as NWMP Trooper Burke
Barbara Worth as Diane La Farge
LeRoy Mason as Andre La Farge
Charles Delaney as NWMP Constable Blackie
Robert Frazer as Jim Hatfield
George Regas as La Farge man Henri
Walter Miller as NWMP Sergeant Layton
Joseph W. Girard as NWMP Inspector O'Keefe
Charles King as Hatfield Henchman Landeau
George Chesebro as LaFarge man Renee
Nelson McDowell as Woodsman Nels
Lafe McKee as Old timer
Artie Ortego as Indian henchman

External links

1934 films
1934 Western (genre) films
American black-and-white films
Films based on American novels
Royal Canadian Mounted Police in fiction
American Western (genre) films
Northern (genre) films
Films based on novels by James Oliver Curwood
Films directed by Ray Taylor
1930s English-language films
1930s American films